Noble Earl "Nobe" Kizer Sr. (March 11, 1900 – June 13, 1940) was an American football and basketball player, football coach, and college athletics administrator. He served as the head football coach at Purdue University from 1930 to 1936. During his tenure as head coach, he won two Big Ten Conference titles and compiled a record of 42–13–3. Kizer was also the athletic director from 1933 until his death in 1940.

From 1922 to 1924, Kizer played right guard at Notre Dame under Knute Rockne. In 1925, he became an assistant coach at Purdue under James Phelan and inherited the head coaching position upon Phelan's departure for the University of Washington.

Kizer served in the United States Marines Corps during World War I. He died on June 13, 1940, in Lafayette, Indiana from a kidney ailment and high blood pressure.

Head coaching record

References

External links
 

1900 births
1940 deaths
American football guards
American men's basketball players
Notre Dame Fighting Irish football players
Notre Dame Fighting Irish men's basketball players
Purdue Boilermakers athletic directors
Purdue Boilermakers football coaches
All-American college men's basketball players
United States Marine Corps personnel of World War I
United States Marines
People from Marshall County, Indiana
Coaches of American football from Indiana
Players of American football from Indiana
Basketball players from Indiana
Deaths from kidney disease